William, Will, or Bill Bedford may refer to:

William Bedford (Royal Navy officer) ( 1764–1827), British Royal Navy officer
William Bedford (chaplain) (1781–1852), English clergyman in Van Diemen's Land
William Kirkpatrick Riland Bedford (1826–1905), English clergyman, author, antiquary, genealogist, and cricketer
William Bedford (footballer) (born  1861), English footballer
William Bedford (basketball) (born 1963), American NBA basketball player
Will Bedford (1885–1909), American baseball player
Bill Bedford (footballer) (1908–1973), Australian rules footballer
Bill Bedford (1920–1996), British test pilot

Other uses
William Bedford Sr. House, historic home in Evansville, Indiana